EUO may refer to:

Ege University Observatory, astronomical observatory in Turkey
Everest University Online, division of the for-profit Everest University
EUobserver, European online newspaper launched in 2000
Europium(II) oxide, (EuO), chemical compound of europium and oxygen